"Some Thoughts on the Science of Onanism" is a speech delivered by Mark Twain in Paris at the Stomach Club in spring, 1879. The Stomach Club was a collection of U.S. expatriate writers and artists, such as Edwin Austin Abbey. The speech satirically dealt with masturbation ("onanism") and the perceived bane it is on society. Long suppressed, the first appearance of a typescript was 25 mimeographed copies released by George Brownwell in 1943. The first printed copies appeared in 1952 as an accordion folded version limited to 100 copies.

References

Essays by Mark Twain
American satire
1879 in France
1879 speeches